Melakabisthalam is a village in the Papanasam taluk of Thanjavur district, Tamil Nadu, India.

Demographics 

As per the 2001 census, Melakabisthalam had a total population of 1940 with 952 males and 988 females. The literacy rate was 79.77.

References 

 

Villages in Thanjavur district